Gölköy can refer to:

 Gölköy
 Gölköy, Çat
 Gölköy, Elâzığ
 Gölköy, İskilip
 Gölköy, Kargı
 Gölköy, Refahiye